Alessandro Arioli (born 24 May 2003) is an Italian football player. He plays for Cosenza.

Club career
He made his Serie B debut for Cosenza on 12 March 2022 in a game against Ternana.

References

External links
 

2003 births
Living people
Italian footballers
Association football forwards
Cosenza Calcio players
Serie B players